Edward I. Alexander Sr. (1850-1911) was a grocer, state legislator, city councilman, and postmaster in Florida. He represented Madison County, Florida in the Florida House of Representatives in 1877, 1879, and 1885. He sought to represent Madison County, Florida in the Florida House of Representatives in 1885.

He was involved in a contested election with Theodore H. Willard for a Florida Senate seat. Both received votes for a seat in the Florida Senate in 1888.

See also
African-American officeholders during and following the Reconstruction era

References

1850 births
1911 deaths
People from Madison County, Florida
African-American politicians during the Reconstruction Era
19th-century American politicians
African-American state legislators in Florida
Members of the Florida House of Representatives
Florida city council members
Florida postmasters
American grocers